Paul Rachman (born September 13, 1962) is an American film director who directed the highly praised 2006 documentary on punk music American Hardcore, which premiered at the Sundance Film Festival and was released by Sony Pictures Classics. He is also one of the founders of the Slamdance Film Festival. He started his career as a music video director with low-budget videos for hardcore punk bands Gang Green and the Bad Brains.  He was later signed to Los Angeles–based Propaganda Films, where he directed music videos for bands Sepultura, Alice in Chains, Temple of the Dog, The Replacements, Kiss, Pantera, Joan Jett, and Roger Waters, among many others.  He made his feature film debut with the low-budget film noir Four Dogs Playing Poker, starring Forest Whitaker, Tim Curry and Balthazar Getty, released by Warner Home Video.  He lives in New York City.

References

External links

Paul Rachman's website
American Hardcore: the history of American punk rock from 1980 to 1986 official movie site

American documentary filmmakers
Film directors from New York City
1959 births
Living people
American music video directors
Boston University alumni